Lamberta (minor planet designation: 187 Lamberta) is a main-belt asteroid that was discovered by Corsican-born French astronomer Jérôme Eugène Coggia on April 11, 1878, and named after the astronomer Johann Heinrich Lambert. It was the second of Coggia's five asteroid discoveries.

The spectrum matches a classification of a C-type asteroid, which may mean it has a composition of primitive carbonaceous materials. It is a dark object as indicated by the low albedo and has an estimated size of about 131 km.

References

External links
 
 

Background asteroids
Lamberta
Lamberta
C-type asteroids (Tholen)
Ch-type asteroids (SMASS)
18780411